This is a list of preserved steam locomotives on the territory of Croatia.

Locomotives

Italian era

FS 835.040 
Location: outside of the Pula railway station

Yugoslav era

JŽ 11-015 
Location: Croatian Railway Museum in Zagreb (HŽM)

JŽ 11-059

JŽ 11-061 

Display in Knin, Croatia

JŽ 11-062

JŽ 20-184 

Displayed with a train of waggons at Jasenovac Concentration Camp as part of a "Memorial Train" display.

JŽ 22-031

JŽ 22-047 

Stored in the depot at Sisak.

JŽ 22-077

JŽ 22-101 
Location: outside of the Sisak railway station

JŽ 33-042

JŽ 33-098

JŽ 33-161

JŽ 33-327

JŽ 50-036

JŽ 51-032 
Location: outside of the Rijeka railway station

JŽ 51-053 

Displayed with a train in a park in Veliki Grđevac.

JŽ 51-060 
 Location:Bjelovar

JŽ 51-103 

Ivanec Railway Station.

JŽ 51-133 
Location: Vinkovci

JŽ 51-136 
Virovitica

JŽ 51-141

JŽ 51-141 

Plinthed outside the Duro Dakovic Factory at Slavonski Brod.

JŽ 51-144 
Location: Croatian Railway Museum in Zagreb (HŽM)

JŽ 51-145 
Location: Varaždin

JŽ 51-148 

Plinthed at Ogulin Bus Station.

JŽ 62-054  
Location: Croatian Railway Museum in Zagreb (HŽM)

JŽ 62-084  
Location: Gračac, used as a monument

Austro-Hungarian era

JŽ 116-037 
Location: Croatian Railway Museum in Zagreb (HŽM)

JŽ 125-052 
Location: Zagreb railway station

WrN 5342 
Location: Puntižela auto-camp near Pula

WrN 5343 
Location: inside Uljanik shipyard, Pula

See also 
Rolling stock of the Croatian Railways
Croatian Railways

References

Preserved steam locomotives of Croatia
Steam locomotives of Croatia
Preserved steam locomotives